Samir Badre Carruthers (born 4 April 1993) is a professional footballer who plays as a midfielder for National League South side Dartford. He has represented the Republic of Ireland at U19 and U21 level.

With over 160 football league appearances, his former clubs include Aston Villa, Sheffield United, Milton Keynes Dons, Oxford United and Cambridge United.

Club career

Early career
Born in Islington, London, Carruthers was playing football local to his hometown of Hatfield, Hertfordshire when he was signed by Cambridge United's under-10 side. He trained frequently with Manchester United, but when Cambridge United abandoned their youth team set-up he signed for Arsenal, the team he supported as a child. He went on to represent Arsenal at under-18 level and captained the club's under-16 side. However, in 2009 Carruthers rejected offers from Fulham and Arsenal in favour of a move to Aston Villa.

Aston Villa
Carruthers signed for Aston Villa in June 2009, aged 16. He made his name playing for the club's reserve and academy sides as an attacking midfielder and winger. Following a number of injuries to Alex McLeish's first team squad in the latter stages of the 2011–12 season, the young midfielder was brought in to train with the first team on a number of occasions.

Carruthers made his first-team debut in Villa's 1–1 Premier League draw at Liverpool on 7 April 2012, replacing Barry Bannan for the final four minutes. He made two further substitute appearances that month.

On 1 April 2013, Carruthers captained Aston Villa's youth squad to the final of the NextGen Series where they beat Chelsea 2–0, at the Stadio Giuseppe Sinigaglia, in Como, Italy.

Milton Keynes Dons

Carruthers was sent out on loan to League One side Milton Keynes Dons on 10 August 2013 on a youth loan until 4 January 2014. He made his debut against Preston North End on 17 August. Coming on as a substitute in the 56th minute, Carruthers won a penalty, which was in turn converted by Shaun Williams, levelling the score at 2–2. A week later he scored within 15 minutes of coming on as a substitute against Bristol City, hitting a left-footed effort into the top corner to earn another 2–2 draw. On 8 January 2014, he extended his loan spell until 3 April. However, on 18 February, he withdrew from a match against Preston North End with a knee injury in the 13th minute, ending his season.

On 6 August 2014, Carruthers signed for Milton Keynes Dons on a three-year deal for an undisclosed fee. He scored his first goal of the season on 13 September in a 5–3 away win against Barnsley, and on 25 April 2015, he scored a second goal, opening a 3–2 win over Rochdale at Spotland. Eight days later the team earned their first promotion to the Championship with a 5–1 home win over Yeovil Town on the final day, with Carruthers setting up the first goal from Carl Baker.

On 19 September 2015, Carruthers received a straight red card for a foul on Stuart Dallas in a 2–1 home loss to Leeds United. He scored once in 39 appearances – opening a 3–2 loss at Blackburn Rovers on 27 February 2016 – as Milton Keynes were relegated.

Sheffield United
On 3 January 2017, it was announced that Carruthers had signed for League One leaders Sheffield United on a three-and-a-half year deal for an undisclosed fee, thought to be worth £250,000. He made his debut four days later in a 4–2 win at Southend United, coming on as a 68th-minute substitute for Mark Duffy but lasting only 15 minutes before withdrawing with injury. He totalled 14 appearances for the Blades, who won the league title with 100 points.

Again as Duffy's replacement, Carruthers scored his first goal for the Blades on 21 November 2017 in a 5–4 loss to Fulham at Bramall Lane. He was transfer-listed by Sheffield United at the end of the 2017–18 season.

Carruthers joined Oxford United in June 2018, on loan for the 2018–19 season. He suffered a knee injury during the first game of the season, and his recovery was interrupted by a recurrence of the injury later in the autumn that required surgery.

Cambridge United
On 29 August 2019, Carruthers joined League Two side Cambridge United on a one-year deal following his release by Sheffield United. He was released by the club at the end of the season.

Non-League
Carruthers dropped down into non-league football with Hemel Hempstead Town for the start of the 2020–21 season. On 24 March 2022, he joined Dartford on loan.

On 9 June 2022, Carruthers joined Dartford on a permanent deal ahead  of the 2022–23 season.

International career
Carruthers is of Irish, Italian and Moroccan descent and is eligible to play for Italy, Morocco, England and the Republic of Ireland, the country of his grandparents. In 2011, he made his debut for the Republic of Ireland U19 team. On 10 September 2012,  Carruthers made his debut for the Republic of Ireland U21 team away to Italy.

Controversy
On 15 March 2016, whilst attending the Cheltenham Festival at Cheltenham Racecourse, Carruthers and Northampton Town's James Collins were photographed urinating into a beer glass whilst standing on a balcony. The following day, Carruthers apologised for his behaviour, and following a meeting with MK Dons manager Karl Robinson and chairman Pete Winkleman he was fined two weeks' wages and suspended by the club. He pledged his fine to charities, including one chosen by the racecourse.

Career statistics

Honours
Aston Villa U19
NextGen Series: 2012–13

Milton Keynes Dons
Football League One runner-up: 2014–15

Sheffield United
EFL League One: 2016–17

Dartford 
Kent Senior Cup: 2021–22

References

External links

1993 births
Living people
Footballers from Islington (district)
English footballers
Republic of Ireland association footballers
Republic of Ireland youth international footballers
Republic of Ireland under-21 international footballers
Association football midfielders
Aston Villa F.C. players
Milton Keynes Dons F.C. players
Sheffield United F.C. players
Oxford United F.C. players
Cambridge United F.C. players
Hemel Hempstead Town F.C. players
Dartford F.C. players
Premier League players
English Football League players
National League (English football) players
English people of Italian descent
English people of Moroccan descent
English sportspeople of African descent
English people of Irish descent
Irish people of Italian descent
Irish people of Moroccan descent
Irish sportspeople of African descent